Hood is an English and Scottish surname. Notable people with the surname include:

Real people

Academics
 Alan Hood, professor at the University of St Andrews
 Christopher Hood (born 1947), Oxford professor
 Hugh Hood (1928–2000), Canadian novelist and professor
 John Hood (born 1952), New Zealand businessman and administrator
 Joseph Douglas Hood (1889–1966), American entomologist
 Leroy Hood (born 1938), American biologist
 Paul Hood (died 1668), English academic administrator
 Sinclair Hood (1917–2021), Irish Archaeologist and academic
 William Hood (20th/21st century), American art historian

Athletes
 Bruce Hood (1936–2018), Canadian author, businessman, politician, and NHL referee
 Edmund Hood (1898–1990), Australian rules footballer 
 Elijah Hood (born 1996), American football player
 Enoch Hood (1861–1940), English footballer
 Frank Hood (1908–1955), American football player
 Graham Hood (born 1972), Canadian middle-distance runner
 Marjorie Hood (20th century), American baseball player
 Peter Hood, Chairman of the Bradford Bulls (an English rugby league club) 
 Roderick Hood (born 1981), American football player
 Rodney Hood (born 1992), American basketball player

Entertainers
 Adam Hood (21st century), American musician
 Amber Hood (born 1970), American actress
 Calum Hood (born 1996), Australian bassist from the band 5 Seconds of Summer
 Darla Hood (1931–1979), American actress
 Dave Hood (born 1950), American actor
 David Hood (born 1943), American musician
 Dictynna Hood, British film director and screenwriter
 Florence Hood (1880–1968), Australian-born Canadian violinist
 Gavin Hood (born 1963), South African director
 Joey Hood (born 1976), voice actor
 Kate Hood, Australian actress
 Kit Hood (1943–2020), Canadian television director
 Morag Hood (1942–2002), Scottish actress
 Patterson Hood (born 1964), American guitarist, singer and songwriter
 Robert Hood (born 1965), American music producer and DJ

Military personnel
 Admiral Hood (disambiguation), multiple people with the surname who were admirals
 Alexander Hood (1758–1798), English Royal Navy officer
 Alexander Hood, 1st Viscount Bridport (1726–1814), English Royal Navy officer
 Arthur Hood, 1st Baron Hood of Avalon (1824–1901), English Royal Navy officer
 Charles Hood (1826–1883), English British Army officer
 Francis Grosvenor Hood (1809–1855), English British Army officer
 Horace Hood (1870–1916), English Royal Navy admiral
 John Hood (naval officer) (1859–1919), American U.S. Navy admiral
 John Bell Hood (1831–1879), American Confederate general
 Michael John Hood (born 1967), Royal Canadian Air Force Lieutenant General, Commander RCAF
 Samuel Hood, 1st Viscount Hood (1724–1816), English Royal Navy officer
 Sir Samuel Hood, 1st Baronet (1762–1814), English Royal Navy officer

Politicians
 Alexander Fuller-Acland-Hood, 1st Baron St Audries (1853–1917), British Conservative Party politician
 Clark L. Hood (1847–1920), American politician
 Dave Hood Jr. (1954–2019), American politician and judge
 Dennis Hood (born 1970), Australian politician
 Glenda Hood (born 1950), former secretary of state for Florida
 Jim Hood (born 1962), Attorney General of Mississippi
 Jimmy Hood (1948–2017), politician in the United Kingdom
 John Hood (Australian politician) (1817–1877), MP in Victoria, Australia
 Morris Hood Jr. (1934–1998), American politician
 Morris Hood III (1965–2020), American politician
 Nicholas Hood (1923–2016), American politician
 Raymond W. Hood (1936–2002), American politician
 Ron Hood (born 1969), American politician
 Samuel Hood, 2nd Baron Bridport (1788–1868), British politician and peer

Writers
 Basil Hood (1864–1917), British librettist and lyricist
 Daniel Hood, American novelist
 Sam Hood (1872–1953), Australian photographer and photojournalist
 Sean Hood (born 1966), American screenwriter
 Stuart Hood (1915–2011), Scottish novelist and former controller of the BBC
 Thomas Hood (1799–1845), British poet and humorist
 Tom Hood (1835–1874), English humorist and playwright

Others
 Archibald Hood (1823–1902), Scottish coalowner
 Cherry Hood (born 1959), Australian artist
 George Hood, (1891–1928), New Zealand pioneer aviator who perished attempting the first flight across the Tasman Sea.
 James Hood (1942–2013), one of the first black students to enroll in the University of Alabama
 Raymond Hood (1881–1934), early twentieth-century architect

Fictional characters
 Baby Bonnie Hood, fictional character
 Red Hood, fictional character in DC Comics
 Robin Hood, English folk hero from medieval legends
Fleet Admiral Lord Terrence Hood, a fictional character in the Halo video-game franchise

English-language surnames
Surnames of English origin
Scottish surnames